Vlasis Andrikopoulos (born 26 April 1999) is a Greek professional footballer who plays as a right-back for Super League 2 club Panathinaikos B.

References

1999 births
Living people
Association football fullbacks
Greek footballers
Footballers from Katerini
Football League (Greece) players
Gamma Ethniki players
Super League Greece 2 players
Aiginiakos F.C. players
Volos N.F.C. players
Episkopi F.C. players
Panathinaikos F.C. B players